The Emory & Henry Wasps (also E&H Wasps) are the athletic teams that represent Emory & Henry College, located in Emory, Virginia, in NCAA Division II intercollegiate sports. The Wasps will compete as members of the South Atlantic Conference as they plan to start playing a full SAC schedule in 2022–23. Altogether, Emory & Henry sponsors 26 sports: 11 men's teams, 11 women's teams, and 4 co-ed teams. Emory & Henry previously competed as members of the Old Dominion Athletic Conference (ODAC) of NCAA Division III from 1976–77 to 2020–21.

History

NCAA investigation
The Emory & Henry football team came under investigation for alleged violations of NCAA bylaws in 2014. The allegations came to public attention after the resignation of former coach Don Montgomery from the football program and departure of the College's president, Dr. Rosalind Reichard. The student newspaper reported that allegations were due to lack of "institutional control" of the athletic department

Mascot 
The official Emory & Henry mascot is the Wasps.  While there are many rumored origins of the nickname, the most commonly accepted story is that Emory & Henry was first called the Wasps after the football team played the first-ever game in Tennessee's Neyland Stadium by a local Knoxville newspaper.  Though Emory and Henry was beaten 27–0, legend has it that the local paper declared "that those Virginia boys stung like wasps," and the nickname has stuck ever since.

Varsity teams

List of teams

Men's teams
 Baseball
 Basketball
 Cross Country
 Football
 Golf
 Soccer
 Swimming
 Tennis
 Indoor Track & Field
 Outdoor Track & Field
 Wrestling

Women's teams
 Basketball
 Cross Country
 Golf
 Soccer
 Softball
 Swimming
 Tennis
 Indoor Track & Field
 Outdoor Track & Field
 Volleyball
 Wrestling

Co-ed teams
 Cheerleading 
 Dance
 Equestrian (IDA)
 Equestrian (IHSA)

Individual teams

Football
The E&H Wasps are credited with inventing an American football offensive formation, named in the college's honor, that divides the offensive line and wide receivers into three groupings of three. While it is primarily used today as a trick play, it was revived in 2007 as an integral part of the A-11 offense, a high school football offensive scheme that was eventually banned due to the exploitation of loopholes in the high school rulebooks. The offense inspired Steve Spurrier to use variations of it as a trick play formation at Florida and South Carolina named "Emory and Henry", as Spurrier attended Wasps games as a child growing up in nearby Johnson City, Tennessee. The formation is featured on EA Sports' NCAA Football 07 video game as well.

The Emory & Henry football team has a long storied history claiming 11 ODAC Conference Championships (more than any other member of the ODAC) since the league's inception in 1976, along with appearing in the 1950 Tangerine Bowl and the 1951 Tangerine Bowl. They have also managed to make it to the 1987 NCAA DIII Semifinal game under coach Lou Wacker before losing to now Division I Wagner College, and well as making it to the DIII playoffs numerous times.  E&H also boasted the nations longest home game winning streak in 1999 at 37 games. In 2004, Y'all magazine listed Emory and Henry among the 40 colleges and universities in the South with the greatest football traditions. "Not to be overshadowed by neighboring Division I powerhouses . . .Winning seasons plus pride and pageantry equals one of the greatest Southern football traditions."

The Wasps football team began play in 1893 beating Virginia Tech 6–0, and have won games against other Division I programs such as Appalachian State, Marshall, The University of Central Florida, and Middle Tennessee State.  The Wasps oldest current football rival is Hampden-Sydney College who first played the Wasps in 1922.

Emory and Henry College has had three players drafted to the NFL over the years.  The most notable being Sonny Wade (class of '69) who went on to play several years in the CFL.

Division III playoff appearances

References

External links